Demons 3 may refer to:

The Church (1989 film), known during production as Demons 3
The Ogre (1989 film), known outside Italy as Demons III: The Ogre
Dèmoni 3, a 1991 film translated from Italian as Demons 3